Charles Lydiard Aubrey Abbott (4 May 1886 – 30 April 1975) was an Australian politician and administrator of the Northern Territory. He was born at St Leonards, Sydney, to Thomas Kingsmill Abbott, a magistrate, and Marion, née Lydiard. He came from a political family – his uncles, Sir Joseph Abbott and William Abbott, had served in the New South Wales Legislative Assembly, while his cousins, Joe Abbott and Mac Abbott, would later enter Federal parliament.

Early life and military service

Educated at The King's School, Sydney, he left school at 14 to work as a jackeroo near Gunnedah; he also attempted to become an actor in Sydney and a stockman in Queensland. He joined the New South Wales Police Force and on 1914 enlisted in the Australian Naval and Military Expeditionary Force, and then transferred to the Australian Imperial Force, and served in New Guinea, Gallipoli, and Sinai. He married Hilda Gertrude Hartnett on 24 October 1916 in Westminster Cathedral in London, where he had been sent after falling ill in the trenches. He returned to World War I in 1917, and took part in the Egyptian Expeditionary Force advance to Damascus. He was wounded in 1918, and promoted to captain. He returned to Australia in 1920.

Member of Parliament

Abbott bought a property near Tamworth, New South Wales, financed by his uncle William, and became active in the Graziers' Association of New South Wales and the Northern New State League. He made an unsuccessful attempt to enter the New South Wales Legislative Assembly in 1925 via the seat of Namoi, but defeated Lou Cunningham to win Gwydir for the Country Party at the federal elections of that year. He rose quickly through parliament and became Minister for Home Affairs in 1928, but was defeated at the 1929 elections.

Administrator of the Northern Territory

No longer a member of parliament, Abbott became secretary to the Primary Producers' Advisory Council, and it has been suggested that he was an organiser of the paramilitary Old Guard. He was returned as the member for Gwydir in 1931 and remained in parliament until 1937, when he was appointed administrator of the Northern Territory. Perceived as insensitive, arrogant and authoritarian, he was met with hostility by many Northern Territorians, especially in Darwin, although he had a good relationship with the pastoral industry. He was instrumental in removing Cecil Cook as chief protector of Aborigines in 1938 and, although he was on good terms with his Aboriginal staff, he was a paternalist who viewed Aborigines mostly as a resource.

Abbott was almost killed in the Japanese bombing attack on Darwin in 1942, and was criticised for lack of leadership. The administration was evacuated to The Residency in Alice Springs and returned in 1945, although he was deposed the following year.

In 1943, Abbott wrote to Joseph Carrodus, secretary of the Department of the Interior, proposing that the federal government use compulsory acquisition to destroy Darwin's Chinatown and thereby reduce the territory's Chinese population. He referred to "the elimination of undesirable elements which Darwin has suffered from far too much in the past" and stated that he hoped to "entirely prevent the Chinese quarter forming again". He further observed that "if land is acquired from the former Chinese residents there is really no need for them to return as they have no other assets". The federal government subsequently passed the Darwin Lands Acquisition Act 1945 which compulsorily acquired  of land owned by Chinese-Australians. The territory's civilian population had mostly been evacuated during the war and the former Chinatown residents returned to find their homes and businesses reduced to rubble.

Later life
In 1950 he published a book, Australia's Frontier Province, in which he surveyed the Northern Territory's development. He retired to Bowral and continued writing. He died on 30 April 1975 at Darlinghurst, and was given a state funeral. He was the last surviving member of Stanley Bruce's Cabinet.

References

Further reading

1886 births
1975 deaths
Australian police officers
Members of the Australian House of Representatives for Gwydir
Members of the Australian House of Representatives
Members of the Cabinet of Australia
National Party of Australia members of the Parliament of Australia
Administrators of the Northern Territory
20th-century Australian politicians
Australian military personnel of World War I
Australian Army officers